Bose–Einstein may refer to:

 Bose–Einstein condensate
 Bose–Einstein condensation (network theory)
 Bose–Einstein correlations
 Bose–Einstein statistics